Koang Deng Kun Kong   is a South Sudanese born-Canada based musician, songwriter, dancer  and artist professionally known as K-Denk.  He was born in Renk, a suburb of Upper Nile State.

Music career
Denk began his music career in 2004 as a choir member in the Kakuma Presbyterian Church choir. Denk took part in Tusker Project Fame 2010 representing South Sudan, which was widely regarded as his breakout moment. He has sung with other artists in the past. In 2018, Denk went on a tour of South Sudanese refugee camps in Uganda and Kenya as part of an "outreach programme" for people affected by the South Sudanese civil war. Denk's song Brighter Day was played over the radio to celebrate the 2018 ceasefire that brought an end to the civil war.

Discography
{| class="wikitable"
|+Songs
!Song Title
!Year
|-
|Ou kene Guut
|2017
|-
|Guola n iwi da ping
|2017
|-
|Wimuon
 |2017
|-
|Happy Wedding
|2017
|-
|Ruor Nyamar
|2017
|-
|Thieli paar
|2017
|-
|William Deng
|2017
|-
|Guola Ni Wida
|2017
|-
|Kni ni dhiech
|2017
|-
|Thieli Chaot
|2017
|-
|Engu Geri
|2017
|-
|Ya Hobi
|2017
|-
|Bakaji Ft. Sweet Angel
|2017
|-
|Ou Kene Guut
|2017
|-
|Enijin Kerua
|2018
|-
|Beautiful Lady
|2018
|-
|Ou ce jiek
|2018
|-
|Rew
|2018
|-
|My Babe
|2018
|-
|Juzza
|2018
|-
|Can't Wait To Love Another Day
|2019
|-
|Ba Guor Ni Dupku
|2019
|-
|Dance with You
|2019
|-
|Shine Up
|2020
|-
|Hope There will be another day
|2020

Studio albums

Awards
In 2011, Denk won "Best HipHop Collaboration" and "HipHop Artist of the year" award at East Africa Kisima Music Awards.
In 2019, he was nominated in the South Sudan Music Awards in "Best International Act" & Best Video of the Video "Jouza" categories.

Personal life
Denk has 4 sisters and 1 brother. His father died in 1992 as a result of the Second Sudanese Civil War. In 2013, Denk received significant attention when he openly declared his allegiance to the Sudan People's Liberation Movement-in-Opposition, posting a video where he brandished an assault rifle. Denk later rescinded his support for the group, instead going back to music and declaring his support for a peaceful resolution to the South Sudanese Civil War. Denk, between 2010 and 2013 attended Admas University Ethiopia, and in 2017 graduated with a diploma in music from Day Star University Nairobi, Kenya.

References

External links
K Denk Biography
K Denk at Willyent
Popular music in South Sudan
Ngangalito Urges K Denk To Drop His Gun and Concentrate on Music
Tusker Project Fame 5 in full gear as Rwandan contestant is axed
Former TPF contestant K-Denk, a warlord?

Living people
South Sudanese musicians
South Sudanese singers
People from Juba
South Sudanese emigrants to Canada
South Sudanese emigrants to the United States
South Sudanese songwriters
South Sudanese singer-songwriters
Year of birth missing (living people)